Highclere is a locality and small rural community in the local government area of Burnie in the North West region of Tasmania.
The 2016 census determined a population of 120 for the state suburb of Highclere.

History
A rail siding was built in the area in 1903. The settlement that grew up around it was known as Oonah Road Siding until 1922, when it was changed to Highclere. The locality was gazetted in 1966.

Geography
The Emu River forms the eastern boundary, and the Guide River forms the western boundary. The Melba rail line passes through from south-west to north.

Road infrastructure
The B18 route (Ridgley Highway) passes through from south to north. Route C101 (Oonah Road) starts at an intersection with B18 and runs west before exiting.

References

Burnie, Tasmania
Towns in Tasmania